The kbkm wz. 2003 (Polish: karabinek maszynowy wzór 2003, English: machine carbine pattern 2003) is a light machine gun of Polish origin, designed in the early 2000s to replace the 7.62×54mmR PKM series of support weapons. The construction if fully compatible with all NATO standards. There were 2 versions developed of this gun: kbkm. 2003S - standard version and kbkm. 2003D - version for airborne or assault units with shorter barrel. Overall it was put into tests and not purchased by the Polish Army.

5.56×45mm NATO machine guns
Light machine guns
Machine guns of Poland